Night Train is an album by the Oscar Peterson Trio, released in 1963 by Verve Records.

Background
Album producer Norman Granz had sold the record label Verve, but remained Peterson's manager, and so supervised the Night Train recording session. The brief duration of many of the tracks has been attributed to a desire to have them played on commercial radio, which was reluctant to play any tracks longer than a few minutes.

The cover art photograph is by Pete Turner and original sleeve notes were by Benny Green.

The album was dedicated to Peterson’s father, who worked as a sleeping-car attendant for Canadian Pacific Railways.

Music and recording
On the title track,
After the opening theme choruses, Peterson slips into a 2-chorus solo. Then the theme returns, and we realize that all the while, the band has gotten softer and softer. This leads into Brown's solo, which is unaccompanied to start, and then adds, in turn, Peterson and Thigpen. When Peterson comes in for another chorus of solo, everything starts to build again. Peterson plays a boogie figure in the bass to build the intensity, and then the trio plays a simple but effective shout chorus and then goes back to the theme with a strong crescendo to nearly the end, with a traditional Count Basie tag to close the track. By using the basic elements of crescendo and diminuendo, and arranged sections to set off the parts, Peterson turns what could have been a throwaway into a minor masterpiece.

On the 1997 CD reissue, an alternate take of "Night Train" carries the title "Happy Go Lucky Local," the name of the 1946 Duke Ellington composition that is the basis of Jimmy Forrest's "Night Train". The alternate take features the same arrangement as the master take.

Ed Thigpen's rivet cymbal, recorded at very close range, is prominent on all issues of the album.

Reception

Writing for AllMusic, critic John Bush wrote the release "includes stately covers of blues and R&B standards". The Penguin Guide to Jazz included it in its core collection, calling it “one of the best-constructed long-players of the period" and saying that Peterson's playing is "tight and uncharacteristically emotional".

In 2019, the album was named as the jury winner of the Polaris Heritage Prize.

Influence
Diana Krall reported that listening to the album made being a jazz pianist her ambition. Linda May Han Oh reported that listening to the album inspired her to start playing upright bass.

Track listing 

(Tracks 12 through 17 are CD bonus tracks, not included on the original vinyl LP)

Personnel 
 Oscar Peterson - piano
 Ray Brown - double bass
 Ed Thigpen - drums

Technical personnel
 Norman Granz – production
 Val Valentin – recording engineering
 Pete Turner – cover photography
 Benny Green - sleeve notes

References

Links
 

Oscar Peterson albums
1962 albums
Verve Records albums
Albums produced by Norman Granz